San Rafael District may refer to:

 Costa Rica:
 San Rafael District, Alajuela, in Alajuela  (canton), Alajuela province
 San Rafael District, Escazú, in Escazú  (canton), San José province
 San Rafael District, Esparza, in Esparza  (canton), Puntarenas province
 San Rafael District, Guatuso, in Guatuso canton, Alajuela province
 San Rafael District, La Unión, in La Unión  (canton), Cartago province
 San Rafael District, Montes de Oca, in Montes de Oca  (canton), San José province
 San Rafael District, Oreamuno, in Oreamuno  (canton), Cartago province
 San Rafael District, Poás, in Poás  (canton), Alajuela province
 San Rafael District, Puriscal, in Puriscal  (canton), San José province
 San Rafael District, San Rafael, in San Rafael  (canton), Heredia province
 San Rafael District, San Ramón, in San Ramón  (canton), Alajuela province
 San Rafael, Vázquez de Coronado, in Vázquez de Coronado  (canton), San José province
 San Rafael Abajo District, in Desamparados  (canton), San José province
 San Rafael Arriba District, in Desamparados  (canton), San José province

See also 
 San Rafael (disambiguation)